Zhang Xianzhong (张献忠 or Chang Hsien-chung; 18 September 1606 – 2 January 1647), nickname Huanghu (literally 'Yellow Tiger'), was a Chinese peasant leader who led a peasant revolt from Yan'an wei, Shaanxi (today Yulin, Shaanxi province). He conquered Sichuan in 1644, and named himself king and later emperor of the Xi dynasty (西朝 or Great Xi 大西). His rule in Sichuan was brief, and he was killed by the invading Qing army. He is commonly associated with the massacres in Sichuan that depopulated the region. However, the extent of his killings is disputed.

Biography

Early life
Zhang was born in liushujian (literally 'willow spring', modern Dingbian, Shaanxi province), into a poor family. He was described as tall in stature, had a yellow complexion and a "tiger chin", and hence was given the nickname "Yellow Tiger". He served in the Ming army, and while in the army he was sentenced to death for violations of military rules, but was reprieved after an intervention by a senior officer who was impressed by his appearance.

As rebel leader
Towards the end the Ming dynasty, drought, famines and epidemics broke out in various part of China. In the late 1620s, peasants revolted in Shaanxi, resisting attempts by the Ming government to collect grains and taxes. They coalesced into rebel armies called "roving bandits" (liúkòu 流寇) because of their highly mobile nature, and spread into other parts of China. Zhang escaped from the army, joined the rebel forces in Mizhi County in 1630, and established himself as a rebel leader, styling himself Bada Wang (八大王, Eighth Great King). His mobile forces would conduct raids along the western edge of Shaanxi, plundering swiftly and hiding out in the hills. Later he moved into other provinces, moving from place to place raiding towns and cities. He was defeated at various times by the Ming forces; Zhang would also surrender when it was expedient for him to do so, for example in 1631 and 1638, but would then later regroup and resume rebellion.

In 1635 he joined a larger confederation of bandits that included another rebel leader, Li Zicheng (Li would later capture Beijing and end the Ming rule there). They devastated Henan and pushed into Anhui. After they had burnt the Ming ancestral temple at Zhongdu (Fengyang) in Anhui and ravaged the area, the rebel armies broke up and Zhang headed to Hubei. In 1637, joined by other rebels and with an army now reaching a size of 300,000 men, he again pushed into Anhui, then to Jiangsu, and almost down to Nanjing. But he was defeated there and he retreated back to Hubei. In 1638, he surrendered to Ming supreme commander Xiong Wencan and was allowed to serve as a regional Ming commander. However, he reneged on the agreement in 1639 and rebelled, and later defeated the Ming forces led by the Ming general Zuo Liangyu. In 1640, he suffered defeats at the hand of Zuo and had to flee with few followers into the mountains of Eastern Sichuan. In 1641 he emerged from Sichuan and attacked Xiangyang, capturing and executing the imperial prince there.

In 1643, he took Macheng in Hubei, and his army swelled to some 57,000 after incorporating the city's rebels. He then captured the provincial capital of Wuchang, killed the imperial prince there, and proclaimed himself "Xi Wang" (King of the West). Wuchang however was soon recaptured by Ming forces, and for a while Zhang stayed at Changsha where he controlled much of Hunan and part of Jiangxi.

Conquest of Sichuan
In 1644, Zhang decided to abandon Hunan and led 100,000 of his troops towards Sichuan. His army converged on Chongqing from two directions and surrounded the city. After several days of fighting, his army managed to blast a hole through the city wall and captured the city on 25 July 1644. He was said to have cut off the hands of the city's defenders and massacred a large number of people.

The conquest of some other parts of Sichuan was made easier after he promised not to harm the local population if they seized their officials, took possession of the storehouse and surrendered without resistance. He took Chengdu on 9 September 1644, and met no real opposition in the rest of Sichuan afterwards. He then set up court in Chengdu, which he renamed Xijing (西京, Western Capital), and declared himself king of the Daxi dynasty (大西王朝, Great Western dynasty). In the 10th lunar month of 1644 he declared himself as emperor with the reign title Dashun.

Rule in Sichuan

In Sichuan he attempted to set up a civil administration and initially gained considerable support. According to an account by Gabriel de Magalhães, a Portuguese Jesuit who was working in Sichuan with another Jesuit Lodovico Buglio (but both pressed to serve as astronomers to Zhang), "he began his rule with such liberality, justice and magnificence by which he captivated all hearts that many mandarins, famous both in civic as in military affairs whom fear was keeping concealed, left their hideouts and flew to his side."

However, resistance to his rule did not cease, and Chongqing was retaken by Ming loyalists in the spring of 1645. Zhang then embarked on a campaign of terror, which was well under way by the middle of 1645, to stamp out the remaining resistance in Sichuan. In November 1645, according to de Magalhães, Zhang, after hearing that "a huge and powerful army was coming against him", announced that "the people of his kingdom had a secret pact with the enemy and planned an uprising; because of this he was determined to kill any suspected resistors". The Jesuits, who now "understood the evil of this man", reported that while they managed to save a few of their Jesuit brothers who were taken, the rest were killed. Zhang's policy of terror increased in intensity, especially in 1646 after he had decided to abandon Sichuan. By then, Zhang's government had virtually disintegrated, all but three of his principal officials had either committed suicide or were executed.

Death
The Manchu Aisin Gioro founded the Qing dynasty in 1636 and advanced through the Great Wall after the fall of the Ming dynasty to rebels of Li Zicheng in 1644. In 1646 the Qing sent out a force under the leadership of Haoge intending to attack Zhang's domain in Sichuan. In October 1646, Zhang decided to abandon Sichuan, and headed towards his homeland in Shaanxi. However, the Qing army was also approaching from Shaanxi, and in January 1647, Zhang and the Qing forces met in Xichong where Zhang had set up camp, and he was killed in the confrontation. According to one account, he was betrayed by one of his officers, a native of Sichuan named Liu Chin-chung (Liu Jinzhong) who resented his policy of terror in Sichuan. Zhang was alerted to their presence and decided to confront them with only 8 to 10 men. Liu pointed Zhang out to the Qing when Zhang rushed out from his tent on learning of the betrayal, and he was then shot and killed by a skilled Manchu archer. The Draft History of Qing has an entirely different account of his death and says he was killed by Oboi during a battle.

Devastation of Sichuan
The events surrounding Zhang's rule and afterwards devastated Sichuan, where he was said to have "engaged in one of the most hair-raising genocides in imperial history". Lurid stories of his killings and flayings were given in various accounts. According to Shu Bi, an 18th-century account of the massacre, after every slaughter, the heads were collected and placed in several big piles, while the hands were placed in other big piles, and the ears and noses in more piles, so that Zhang could keep count of his killings. In one incident, he is said to have organized an imperial examination ostensibly to recruit scholars for his administration, only to have all the candidates, who numbered many thousands, killed. In another, to give thanks for his recovery after an illness, he was said to have cut off the feet of many women. The severed feet were heaped in two piles with those of his favorite concubine, whose feet were unusually small, placed on top. These two piles of feet were then doused in oil and set alight to become what he called "heavenly candles".

He was reported to have ordered further massacres before he abandoned Chengdu in advance of the Qing armies. The massacres, a subsequent famine and epidemic, attacks by tigers, as well as people fleeing from the turmoil and the Qing armies, resulted in a large-scale depopulation of Sichuan. The worst affected areas are believed to be Chengdu and its surrounding counties, and places on the path of Zhang's retreat from Chengdu to Shaanxi.

Seven Kill Stele

A popular account of his life has it that he erected in Chengdu a stele, which came to be known as the Seven Kill Stele, with the following inscription:

There are, however, considerable doubts that this account is accurate. In 1934, a stele thought to be this very one was found by a missionary – its reverse side contains an added inscription by a Ming general commemorating Zhang's numerous victims whose bones he had collected and buried in 1646. While the first two lines of the poem on this stele are similar, the line with the seven kills is absent in this stele. Instead the actual line reads: "The spirits and gods are knowing, so reflect on this and examine yourselves" (鬼神明明，自思自量). Many therefore considered the story to be a distortion from the Qing era.

Deaths
The actual number of people killed by Zhang is not known and is disputed. Official Ming dynasty history Ming Shi recorded a figure of 600 million deaths due to Zhang's activities, an obvious exaggeration, since the total population of China at that time was less than 150 million, perhaps much lower. According to an assessment by a modern historian, "the death toll is reputed to have been enormous, possibly one million out of a total provincial population of three million, before he was eventually killed by the Manchus." The combination of deaths from the massacres and other causes as well as flight of people from the province resulted in a sharp drop in the population of Sichuan. The population has been estimated to have dropped by as much as 75%, with fewer than a million people left in Sichuan, most of whom were clustered in the periphery areas. The last Ming census figure for Sichuan in 1578 (more than 60 years before Zhang entered Sichuan) gave a population of 3,102,073. However, by 1661, only 16,096 adult males were registered in Sichuan, and Chengdu was said to have become a virtual ghost town frequented by tigers. A later figure for Sichuan was from the 1720s, which is over 70 years after Zhang's death and long after the resettlement of Sichuan had begun, and it recorded 634,802 households (which one estimate calculated to be around 2.5 million individuals).

Many, while acknowledging the massacres committed, do not believe that Zhang was responsible for the greater part of the population collapse in Sichuan, and thought that the greatest loss happened after his death due to the continuing turmoil, famine and diseases. Some argued that while a great many died, Sichuan did not become virtually depopulated as recorded. Some modern Chinese historians considered him a proto-revolutionary, maintaining that accounts of the massacres were exaggerated, or were committed by others including the Qing armies, that his victims were Ming nobles, rich landlords, and other "counter-revolutionary" elements, and that his heinous reputation was the result of "Qing slanders" and "reactionary propaganda".

Aftermath
Before he had abandoned Sichuan, Zhang divided his forces into four divisions, each led by one of his four generals (Li Dingguo, Sun Kewang, Liu Wenxiu, Ai Nengqi). These remnants of his army, as well as Ming loyalists, held out in Sichuan, Yunnan, and Guizhou after Zhang's death, and most of Sichuan did not come under control of the Qing until a dozen years or so later, and fighting only finally ended in eastern Sichuan in 1664.

Resettlement of Sichuan
In order to fill up the depopulated regions of Sichuan, a massive resettlement program was initiated during the Qing dynasty, starting around 1670 or 1671 and lasting more than two centuries. Millions of people from Hubei, Fujian, Jiangxi, Guangdong, Shaanxi and other provinces were resettled in Sichuan. Some of the early migrants were those who returned after fleeing Sichuan (including the ancestors of Chinese leader Deng Xiaoping), but some were also coerced. A large number of the migrants came from Huguang (now Hubei/Hunan), and the migration was therefore described by 19th century scholar Wei Yuan as "". By the 1720s, 70–80% of the population of Sichuan was reportedly non-native, and as much as 85% a century later.

References

Further reading

Liu Xianting 劉獻廷, Guangyang zaji 廣陽雜記 
Mingshi 明史 (History of Ming) 
Peng Zunsi 彭遵泗 (fl. 18th century), Shu Bi 蜀碧 
.

External links 
 

1606 births
1647 deaths
17th-century Chinese monarchs
Ming dynasty people
People from Yulin, Shaanxi
Ming dynasty rebels
Founding monarchs
Transition from Ming to Qing
Genocide perpetrators